Øyeflaten Station is a railway station along the Bergensbanen railway line.  It is located in the village of Øyeflaten in the Raundalen valley in the municipality of Voss, Vestland county, Norway. The station is served by the Bergen Commuter Rail, operated by Vy Tog, with up to five daily departures in each direction. The station was opened in 1931.

External links
 Jernbaneverket's page on Øyeflaten

Railway stations in Voss
Railway stations on Bergensbanen
Railway stations opened in 1931